Acria cocophaga is a moth in the family Depressariidae. It was described by Fu-Qiang Chen and Chun-Sheng Wu in 2011. It is found in Hainan, China.

The larvae feed on Cocos species.

References

Moths described in 2011
Acria
Moths of Asia